The 1996 CCHA Men's Ice Hockey Tournament was the 25th CCHA Men's Ice Hockey Tournament. It was played between March 8 and March 16, 1996. Opening round games were played at campus sites, while all 'final four' games were played at Joe Louis Arena in Detroit, Michigan. By winning the tournament, Michigan received the Central Collegiate Hockey Association's automatic bid to the 1996 NCAA Division I Men's Ice Hockey Tournament.

Format
The tournament featured three rounds of play. The three teams that finish below eighth place in the standings were not eligible for postseason play. In the quarterfinals, the first and eighth seeds, the second and seventh seeds, the third seed and sixth seeds and the fourth seed and fifth seeds played a best-of-three series, with the winners advancing to the semifinals. In the semifinals, the remaining highest and lowest seeds and second highest and second lowest seeds play a single-game, with the winners advancing to the finals. The tournament champions received an automatic bid to the 1996 NCAA Division I Men's Ice Hockey Tournament.

Conference standings
Note: GP = Games played; W = Wins; L = Losses; T = Ties; PTS = Points; GF = Goals For; GA = Goals Against

Bracket

Note: * denotes overtime period(s)

Quarterfinals

(1) Lake Superior State vs. (8) Ohio State

(2) Michigan vs. (7) Miami

(3) Michigan State vs. (6) Ferris State

(4) Western Michigan vs. (5) Bowling Green

Semifinals

(1) Lake Superior State vs. (5) Bowling Green

(2) Michigan vs. (3) Michigan State

Championship

(1) Lake Superior State vs. (2) Michigan

Tournament awards

All-Tournament Team
F Bobby Hayes (Michigan)
F Gerald Tallaire (Lake Superior State)
F John Madden* (Michigan)
D Keith Aldridge (Lake Superior State)
D Harold Schock (Michigan)
G John Grahame (Lake Superior State)
* Most Valuable Player(s)

References

External links
CCHA Champions
1995–96 CCHA Standings
1995–96 NCAA Standings

CCHA Men's Ice Hockey Tournament
Ccha tournament